A by-election was held for the Australian House of Representatives seat of Franklin on 14 December 1929. This was triggered by the death of independent MP William McWilliams.

The by-election was won by Labor candidate Charles Frost.

Results

William McWilliams (Independent) died.

References

1929 elections in Australia
Tasmanian federal by-elections
1920s in Tasmania